Gary Geld (born October 18, 1935, Paterson, New Jersey) is an American composer known for his work creating musicals and popular songs with his lyricist partner Peter Udell. 

Raised in Clifton, New Jersey, Geld graduated from Clifton High School, where he won a songwriting competition. A graduate of New York University, Geld composed the music to the popular songs "Sealed With A Kiss", "Save Your Heart for Me" and "Hurting Each Other" with Udell as lyricist. The two men also co-created the Broadway musicals Purlie (1970, a nominee for the Tony Award for Best Musical), Shenandoah (1975), and Angel (1978).  His music for Shenandoah was nominated for the Tony Award for Best Original Score in 1975. Geld and Udell also contributed songs to the musical dance revue American Dance Machine (1978).

References

1935 births
Living people
Clifton High School (New Jersey) alumni
Songwriters from New Jersey
People from Clifton, New Jersey
People from Paterson, New Jersey
20th-century American composers
American musical theatre composers
Broadway composers and lyricists
New York University alumni